The March can refer to:
 March on Washington for Jobs and Freedom, a 1963 civil rights event
 Salt March, when Gandhi in 1930 walked to protest the British salt tax in India
 Sherman's March to the Sea during the American Civil War
 Long March in China in the 1930s
 Bataan Death March in the Philippines during World War II
 The March (1945), forced marches across Europe by Allied POWs during World War II
 The March (novel), a book by E. L. Doctorow about Sherman's March to the Sea
 The March (album), an album by Unearth
 The March (1964 film), a 1964 documentary film by James Blue about the 1963 March on Washington for Jobs and Freedom
 The March (1990 film), a film aired by the BBC1 in 1990
 The March (2013 film), a 2013 documentary film, also about the 1963 March on Washington for Jobs

See also
Marche, or "The Marches", a region of Italy
March (disambiguation)